The General civil code ( or ABGB) is the Civil Code of Austria, which after about 40 years of preparatory work was published on 1 June 1811 and came into force on 1 January 1812. Karl Anton Freiherr von Martini and Franz von Zeiller were the leading drafters at the earlier and later stages of the draft. Comparable to the Napoleonic code, it was based on the ideals of freedom and equality before the law. It was divided into three major segments, following the Roman law segregation methods. It was modernized during the First World War. ABGB continues to be the basic civil code of Austria to this day and it is also still the basic civil code of Liechtenstein. Besides Austria, its influence persists in other successor states of Austria-Hungary. In the Czech part of Czechoslovakia (the Slovak part used Hungarian customary law) it was in effect until 1951, although it had been novelized multiple times, until it was replaced by the civil code from 1950. In southern Poland it was partially in effect until the end of 1946. In Bosnia and Herzegovina it was partially introduced after 1878, and some parts are still in use, even after this country's independence.

1811 in law
Law of Austria
Civil codes